Hsi-Chun "Mike" Hua (Chinese: 華錫鈞) was a Republic of China Air Force pilot who played a leading role in the development of the Air Force and of aeronautics in Taiwan. He was known in Taiwan as "the father of the Indigenous Defense Fighter".

Born on December 6, 1925, in Wuxi, China, after immigrating to Taiwan he graduated from the Republic of China Air Force Academy and qualified to fly the F-86 Sabre. He then attended the US Air Force Lockheed U-2 pilot training academy.

On August 3, 1959, during his seventh U-2 training flight, Hua was the hero of a famous aviation incident. Thirteen miles above Utah he lost power. Flying dead stick, he successfully located the Cortez Municipal Airport and landed his U-2, a notoriously difficult plane to land even in the best of circumstances. After his return to Taiwan he flew covert reconnaissance missions over People's Republic of China airspace as a member of the ROC Air Force 35th Black Cat Squadron.

In 1964 he enrolled in the aeronautics program at Purdue University, from which he received a master's degree in 1965 and a  doctorate in 1968. After working at Cessna and Lockheed Aircraft he returned to Taiwan in 1970 to lead the Aero Industry Development Center where he helped to develop the AT-3 jet trainer and the Indigenous Defense Fighter.

During his military career he served as an adjunct faculty member at National Cheng Kung University and Tunghai University. In 1982 he was promoted to general.

In his latter years, Hua sponsored domestic military aviation research and development. In 2012 he donated NT$15 million to National Cheng Kung University and in 2017 he established the Hua Hsi Chun Aeronautical Engineering Foundation. He died in Taichung, Taiwan on January 24, 2017, at the age of 92.

References

Republic of China Air Force personnel
1925 births
2017 deaths